Events from the year 1965 in Canada.

Incumbents

Crown 
 Monarch – Elizabeth II

Federal government 
 Governor General – Georges Vanier
 Prime Minister – Lester B. Pearson
 Chief Justice – Robert Taschereau (Quebec)
 Parliament – 26th (until September 8) then 27th (from December 9)

Provincial governments

Lieutenant governors 
Lieutenant Governor of Alberta – John Percy Page   
Lieutenant Governor of British Columbia – George Pearkes 
Lieutenant Governor of Manitoba – Errick Willis (until November 1) then Richard Spink Bowles 
Lieutenant Governor of New Brunswick – Joseph Leonard O'Brien (until June 9) then John B. McNair 
Lieutenant Governor of Newfoundland – Fabian O'Dea 
Lieutenant Governor of Nova Scotia – Henry Poole MacKeen  
Lieutenant Governor of Ontario – William Earl Rowe 
Lieutenant Governor of Prince Edward Island – Willibald Joseph MacDonald 
Lieutenant Governor of Quebec – Paul Comtois 
Lieutenant Governor of Saskatchewan – Robert Hanbidge

Premiers 
Premier of Alberta – Ernest Manning   
Premier of British Columbia – W.A.C. Bennett 
Premier of Manitoba – Dufferin Roblin  
Premier of New Brunswick – Louis Robichaud 
Premier of Newfoundland – Joey Smallwood 
Premier of Nova Scotia – Robert Stanfield 
Premier of Ontario – John Robarts 
Premier of Prince Edward Island – Walter Shaw 
Premier of Quebec – Jean Lesage  
Premier of Saskatchewan – Ross Thatcher

Territorial governments

Commissioners 
 Commissioner of Yukon – Gordon Robertson Cameron  
 Commissioner of Northwest Territories – Bent Gestur Sivertz

Events
January 1 – Trans-Canada Airlines is renamed Air Canada.
January 9 – The Hope Slide, the largest landslide ever recorded in Canada, kills four.
January 16 – The Canada-United States Automotive Agreement is signed
January 28 – The Queen issues a royal proclamation, effective February 15, making the Maple Leaf flag the National Flag of Canada.
February 15 – National Flag of Canada Day, marked by ceremonies across the Dominion, the Maple Leaf becomes the National Flag.
March 2 – Lucien Rivard escapes from a Montreal area jail
March 7 – Canadian Roman Catholic churches celebrate mass in the vernacular for the first time due to the reforms of Vatican II
March 20 – Peter Lougheed is elected leader of the Alberta Progressive Conservative Party
April 2 – Lester Pearson gives a speech at Temple University in the United States that calls for a stop to the bombing of North Vietnam, infuriating President Lyndon Johnson
May 16 – Cross Country Checkup debuts on radio
June 7 – Navy, army, and air force commands are replaced by six functional commands
July 8 – A crash of a Canadian Pacific Airlines flight in British Columbia kills 52.
September 9 – The Fowler Report is released.  It advocates creation of the Canadian Radio-television and Telecommunications Commission (CRTC)

September 13 - The new Toronto City Hall is opened.
November 8 – Federal election: Lester Pearson's Liberals win a second consecutive minority
November 9 – A failure at an Ontario power station causes the 1965 Blackout that stretches from Florida to Chicago and all of southern Ontario.
November 29 – Alouette 2 is launched.

Full date unknown
Eligibility age for pensions is lowered from 70 to 65

Arts and literature

New books
George Grant: Lament for a Nation
John Newlove: Moving in Alone
Robert Kroetsch: But We Are Exiles
Farley Mowat: West Viking
Gilles Archambault: La vie à trois
Hubert Aquin: Prochain épisode

Awards
Gordon R. Dickson's Soldier, Ask Not wins a Hugo Award
See 1965 Governor General's Awards for a complete list of winners and finalists for those awards.
Stephen Leacock Award: Gregory Clark,  War Stories
Vicky Metcalf Award: Roderick Haig-Brown

Music
Karel Ančerl replaces Seiji Ozawa as artistic director of the Toronto Symphony Orchestra

Film
October 13 – The Canadian Film Development Agency is formed
Christopher Plummer stars as Captain von Trapp in The Sound of Music
William Shatner stars in Incubus

Sport 
March 11 – The NHL admits the California Seals, Los Angeles Kings, Minnesota North Stars, Philadelphia Flyers, Pittsburgh Penguins, and the St. Louis Blues into the league through expansion
March 13 - Manitoba Bisons won their First University Cup be defeating the St. Dunstan's Saints 9 to 2, the Final game was played the Winnipeg Arena
May 1 - The Montreal Canadiens won their Thirteenth Stanley Cup by defeating the Chicago Black Hawks 4 games to 3. The deciding Game 7 was played at the Montreal Forum. Trois-Rivières, Quebec's Jean Beliveau is awarded the First Conn Smythe Trophy as the 1965 Playoffs MVP
September 10 - Future hall of fame baseball player Ferguson Jenkins plays his first major league game for the Philadelphia Phillies in Connie Mack Stadium
May 11 - Ontario Hockey Association's Niagara Falls Flyers won their First Memorial Cup by defeating the Central Alberta Hockey League's Edmonton Oil Kings 4 games to 0. All games were played at Edmonton Gardens 
November 20 - Toronto Varsity Blues defeated the Alberta Golden Bears 14–7 in the 1st Vanier Cup played at Varsity Stadium in Toronto
November 27 - The Hamilton Tiger-Cats won their 4th Grey Cup by defeating the Winnipeg Blue Bombers 22–16 in the 53rd Grey Cup in Toronto's CNE Stadium.

Births

January to March
January 8
 Wendy Fuller, diver
 Eric Wohlberg, racing cyclist
January 21 – Brian Bradley, ice hockey player
January 23 – Tim Berrett, race walker
January 27 – Ross MacDonald, sailor and Olympic silver medallist

January 28
 Stéphane Bergeron, politician
 Lynda Boyd, actress 
 Tom Ponting, swimmer and double Olympic silver medallist
January 31 – Ofra Harnoy, cellist
March 1 – Stewart Elliott, jockey
March 7 - Alison Redford, politician, and the 14th Premier of Alberta
March 15 – Marcel Gery, swimmer and Olympic bronze medallist
March 23 – Daren Puppa, ice hockey player

April to June
April 11 – Chris Pridham, tennis player
April 21 – Ed Belfour, ice hockey player
April 22 – Peter Zezel, ice hockey player (d. 2009)
May 7 – Owen Hart, wrestler (d. 1999)
May 9 – Steve Yzerman, ice hockey player
May 10 – Linda Evangelista, supermodel
May 19 – James Bezan, politician
June 19 – Gary Vandermeulen, swimmer
June 25 – Julie Daigneault, swimmer
June 26 – Gaye Porteous, field hockey player

July to September
July 11 – Michael Wayne McGray, serial killer
July 17 – Ken Evraire, television journalist, host and former professional footballer 
July 26 – Michael Rascher, rower and Olympic gold medallist

August 11 – Marc Bergevin, ice hockey player
August 22
 Patricia Hy-Boulais, tennis player
 David Reimer, Canadian man, born male but reassigned female and raised as a girl after a botched circumcision
August 28 – Shania Twain, singer-songwriter
September 8 – Mark Andrews, swimmer
September 9 - Eric Tunney, comedian (Kids in the Hall: Brain Candy) (d. 2010)

September 27
 Bernard Lord, politician and 30th Premier of New Brunswick
 Peter MacKay, lawyer, politician and Minister

October to December
October 1 – Cliff Ronning, ice hockey player
October 5
 Mario Lemieux, ice hockey player
 Patrick Roy, ice hockey player
October 23 – David Bédard, diver

October 29 – Christy Clark, politician and 35th Premier of British Columbia
November 5 – Andrew Crosby, rower and Olympic gold medallist
November 13 - Rick Roberts, actor
November 20 – John Graham, track and field athlete
November 21 – Jon Kelly, swimmer
November 24 – Brad Wall, politician and 14th Premier of Saskatchewan
November 27 – Kathleen Heddle, rower and triple Olympic gold medallist (d. 2021)
December 1 – Jamie Pagendam, boxer
December 10 – Jennifer Wyatt, golfer
December 18 – Brian Walton, road and track cyclist and coach
December 29 - Manon Perreault, politician

Full date unknown
 Emanuel Jaques, murder victim (d. 1977)

Deaths
January 17 – Austin Claude Taylor, politician (b.1893)
April 1 – Harry Crerar, General (b.1888)
June 7 – John Stewart McDiarmid, politician and Lieutenant-Governor of Manitoba (b.1882)
July 19 - Franklin D. McDowell, author
August 23 – George Black, politician (b.1873)
August 28 – Jacob Penner, politician (b.1880)
September 10 – S. E. Rogers, politician (b.1888)
September 20 - Madge Macbeth, author
October 8 - Thomas B. Costain, historian (b.1885)
November 25 - Gwethalyn Graham, author (b.1913)

See also
 1965 in Canadian television
 List of Canadian films

References

 
Years of the 20th century in Canada
Canada
1965 in North America